The Jesuit Music Ministry (JMM) is a Philippines-based producer and publisher of music for use in the liturgy of the Roman Catholic church. It also manages a group of artists and composers, whose works are widely used in the liturgy of the Holy Mass in the Philippines. It is based in the Jesuit Ateneo de Manila University in Quezon City.

The Jesuit Ateneo produced its first successful composer in the person of Fr. Eduardo Hontiveros, SJ, whose works (first published in the 1960s) were used in various Catholic rites throughout the country (among his familiar compositions is the Papuri sa Diyos). Other Jesuit priests and religious men followed suit, among which were:

 Manoling Francisco, SJ - composer of Hindi Kita Malilimutan ("I will never forget you", based on Isaiah 49); Tanging Yaman ("Precious Treasure") (which became the theme song of a Filipino film of the same title); and "Sa 'Yo Lamang" ("Only yours"). These three songs were covered by popular singers in the Philippines and, perhaps, are the most commercially successful songs published by the JMM.
 Charlie Cenzon, SJ
 Nemy Que, SJ
 Arnel Aquino, SJ
 Jboy Gonzales, SJ
 Tim Ofrasio, SJ
 Fruto Ramirez, SJ
 Danny Isidro, SJ
 Johnny Go, SJ

The JMM has also published music by non-Jesuits, some of which were alumni of the Ateneo. Among these include Jandi Arboleda, Norman Agatep (of Bukas Palad Music Ministry) and Paulo Tirol (of Hangad).

Artists under the JMM 
 Bukas Palad Music Ministry
 Canto Cinco (C5)
 Chinese Friends of the Jesuit
 Himig Heswita
 Hangad
 Koro Ilustrado
 Musica Chiesa

See also
 List of record labels

External links 
Jesuit Music Ministry -official website
Ateneo de Manila University - information about the JMM
Links to official JMM artists' websites:
Bukas Palad Online - official website
Hangad Online - official website
Canto Cinco at Multiply - the official Multiply.com account of Canto Cinco

Philippine record labels
Music publications
Sheet music publishing companies